Conus archiepiscopus is a species of sea snail, a marine gastropod mollusk, in the family Conidae, the cone snails and their allies.

Distribution
This marine species occurs off Tanzania and Madagascar

References

archiepiscopus